Kings Marsh is a former civil parish, now in the parish of Farndon, in the borough of Cheshire West and Chester and ceremonial county of Cheshire in England. In 2001 it had a population of 30. The civil parish was abolished in 2015 and merged into Farndon.

References

External links

Former civil parishes in Cheshire
Cheshire West and Chester